DXCK (91.9 FM), broadcasting as 91.9 iFM News, is a radio station owned and operated by the Radio Mindanao Network. The station's studio and transmitter is located at the RMN Broadcast Center, Bulaong National Highway, Brgy. Dadiangas North, General Santos.

References

Radio stations in General Santos
Radio stations established in 1994